Daniel Thivart (1611 in Amsterdam – 1656 in Amsterdam) was a Dutch Golden Age genre painter.

Biography
According to the RKD he was influenced by Leonaert Bramer and Willem de Poorter. He is known for religious scenes and historical allegories such as "Silvio en Dorinda", "Paulus en Barnabus", "Theagenes en Chariclea", and others.

References

Daniel Thivart on Artnet

1611 births
1656 deaths
Dutch Golden Age painters
Dutch male painters
Painters from Amsterdam
Dutch genre painters